Pavel Eliáš (born 26 November 1986) is a footballer from Czech Republic playing currently for USV Oed/Zeillern.

References
 
 Guardian Football

1986 births
Living people
Czech footballers
Czech First League players
FK Jablonec players
SK Slavia Prague players
Association football midfielders
Czech expatriate sportspeople in India
Footballers from Prague